Archduke Joseph Karl of Austria (2 March 1833 – 13 June 1905) was a member of the Habsburg-Lorraine dynasty. He was the second son of Archduke Joseph, Palatine of Hungary (seventh son of Leopold II, Holy Roman Emperor) and Duchess Maria Dorothea of Württemberg.

Biography
Like many junior members of royal families, Archduke Joseph Karl entered the military. He became a Major General in the Austrian Army in 1860. During the Austro-Prussian War he commanded a Brigade in the North Army and had three horses shot under him at Königgrätz. In 1867, he became Palatine of Hungary after the death of his childless half-brother Stephen, though the post by that time was symbolic only.

The archduke had an interest in the Romani language and occasionally wrote on this topic to Albert Thomas Sinclair, an American lawyer who shared this interest.  A biography of Sinclair notes that the archduke sent a copy of his work, "a large octavo volume handsomely bound. It is a most important and valuable philological work comparing the gypsy words with Sanskrit, Hindustani Persian, etc".

As early as the late 1880s, Archduke Josef advocated turning the poor fishing village of Crikvenica into a new health resort. In 1895 the Grand Hotel named after the archduke was opened there.

His residence was the Archduke Joseph's Palace in Budapest.

Marriage and issue
On 12 May 1864 in Coburg, Archduke Joseph married Princess Clotilde of Saxe-Coburg and Gotha (1846–1927), the elder daughter of Prince August of Saxe-Coburg and Gotha and Princess Clémentine of Orléans. They had seven children :

 Archduchess Elisabeth Klementine Klothilde Maria Amalie (18 March 1865 – 7 January 1866)
 Archduchess Maria Dorothea Amalie (14 June 1867 – 6 April 1932)
 Archduchess Margarethe Klementine Maria (6 July 1870 – 2 May 1955)
 Archduke Joseph August Viktor Klemens Maria (9 August 1872 – 6 July 1962)
 Archduke Ladislaus Philipp (16 July 1875 – 6 September 1895), no issue
 Archduchess Elisabeth Henriette Klothilde Maria Viktoria (9 March 1883 – 8 February 1958), married Zoltán Decleva, Hungarian Army Commander in WWII.
 Archduchess Klothilde Maria Amalie Philomena Raineria (9 May 1884 – 14 December 1903), no issue.

Honours and awards
He received the following orders and decorations:

Ancestry

References

Hungarian nobility
Hungarian-German people
House of Habsburg-Lorraine
People from Bratislava
1833 births
1905 deaths
Burials at Palatinal Crypt
Palatines of Hungary
Austrian princes
Knights of the Golden Fleece of Austria
Grand Crosses of the Order of Saint Stephen of Hungary
Grand Crosses of the Order of the Star of Romania